Larkinella harenae  is a Gram-negative and short rod-shaped bacterium from the genus of Larkinella which has been isolated from soil from the Iho Tewoo Beach in Korea.

References 

Cytophagia
Bacteria described in 2017